Mitchell Harrison White (born December 28, 1994) is an American professional baseball pitcher for the Toronto Blue Jays of Major League Baseball (MLB). He previously played in MLB for the Los Angeles Dodgers.

Amateur career
White attended Bellarmine College Preparatory in San Jose, California and played college baseball at Santa Clara University. He missed his freshman season in 2014 after undergoing Tommy John surgery. He returned in 2015 as a relief pitcher and in 2016 became a starter. After his sophomore season, he was selected by the Los Angeles Dodgers in the second round of the 2016 Major League Baseball Draft.

Professional career

Los Angeles Dodgers
White made his professional debut with the Arizona League Dodgers. After two starts he was promoted to the Great Lakes Loons and ended the season with the Rancho Cucamonga Quakes. He did not allow an earned run in 22 innings over 11 games (six starts) for the three teams in 2016. In 2017, he made 19 starts across three levels, with nine for the Quakes, seven for the Tulsa Drillers and three rehab appearances for the Arizona Dodgers. He posted a combined 3–2 record with a 2.93 ERA and 88 strikeouts in 73.2 total innings pitched between the three teams. White spent 2018 with the Tulsa Drillers, going 6-7 with a 4.53 ERA in 22 starts.

White returned to Tulsa to begin 2019 but was promoted to the Triple-A Oklahoma City Dodgers after seven starts. Overall he made 13 starts (and three relief appearances) with a 4–6 record and 5.09 ERA. He was added to the 40-man roster after the season. He was called up to the Majors for the first time on August 1, 2020 but was optioned back to the minors the following day without appearing in a game.  

White made his major league debut on August 28, 2020 against the Texas Rangers, pitching one scoreless inning and recording his first MLB strikeout against Shin-Soo Choo. On September 18, 2020, he pitched two scoreless innings out of relief and recorded his first career major league victory against the Colorado Rockies. He only pitched in two games during the 2020 season, working three innings, walking one, allowing one hit and striking out two.

White pitched in 21 games for the Dodgers during the 2021 season, with four starts. He allowed 19 earned runs in  innings for a 3.66 ERA and struck out 49 while walking 19. On August 18, he pitched 7⅔ scoreless innings out of relief in the team's victory 9-0 victory over the Pittsburgh Pirates. He also pitched in 12 games in the minor leagues with a 3–0 record and 1.65 ERA. He was recalled and optioned 10 times each during the season. In the 2022 season, White appeared in 15 games for the Dodgers (making 10 starts) and had a 1–2 record and 3.70 ERA.

Toronto Blue Jays
On August 2, 2022, White and Alex De Jesus were traded to the Toronto Blue Jays in exchange for Nick Frasso and Moises Brito.

Personal life
White is half-Korean; his grandparents, mother Hailey and aunt Juju immigrated to the United States from South Korea in 1969. They settled in the Bay Area, but his grandfather became a dedicated Dodgers fan as the family established roots in the new country. White’s older brother Spencer was a lacrosse player for the UC San Diego Tritons. White is the nephew of ABC correspondent Juju Chang.

References

External links

Santa Clara Broncos bio

Living people
1994 births
American baseball players of Korean descent
Baseball players from San Jose, California
Major League Baseball pitchers
Los Angeles Dodgers players
Toronto Blue Jays players
Santa Clara Broncos baseball players
Arizona League Dodgers players
Great Lakes Loons players
Rancho Cucamonga Quakes players
Tulsa Drillers players
Oklahoma City Dodgers players
Glendale Desert Dogs players
Bellarmine College Preparatory alumni
Buffalo Bisons (minor league) players